Vandegrift High School is a public high school in Travis County, Texas. It educates students in grades 9-12 for the Leander Independent School District.

History
The school is named for United States Marine Corps First Lieutenant Matthew Ryan Vandegrift, who was killed in action.  The school's first year of operation, 2009, was at adjacent Four Points Middle School, and it then transferred to the Vandegrift campus at the start of the 2010 school year.

Academics 
Vandegrift High School has "dual credit" with Austin Community College, which allows juniors and seniors to get college credit while still in high school.

Vandegrift was ranked 54th in the state and 342nd nationally in the 2016 U.S. News & World Report rankings.

26 AP classes are offered as well as International Baccalaureate (IB) courses.

Demographics
The demographic breakdown of the 1875 students enrolled in 2013-14 was:
Male - 50.7%
Female - 49.3%
Native American/Alaskan - 0.4%
Asian/Pacific Islander - 7.7%
Black - 3.4%
Hispanic - 14.6%
White - 70.6%
Multiracial - 3.3%

5.8% of the students were eligible for free or reduced lunch.

Feeder patterns
Its feeder schools are Canyon Ridge Middle School and Four Points Middle School.

Performing arts
Vandegrift has a competitive show choir, the all-female group "Venom", named after the award-winning 2018 film.

Accomplishments

In November 2013, Vandegrift High School took first place at the UIL Class 4A State Marching Band Championships. 

The girls' soccer team won the 2014 UIL Class 4A championship.

The boys' golf team won the 4A state championship in 2014.

In 2019, the marching band won the Bands of America Grand Nationals in Indianapolis for the first time.

In 2022, the marching band won the UIL Class 6A championship.

References

External links 

Educational institutions established in 2009
High schools in Austin, Texas
Leander Independent School District high schools
Public high schools in Travis County, Texas
2009 establishments in Texas